Mount Ginini is a mountain with an elevation of   in the Brindabella Ranges that is located on the border between the Australian Capital Territory and New South Wales in Australia.

Geography
The summit of the mountain is located within the ACT, and is the third highest mountain in the Territory. The ACT portion of the mountain is located in Bimberi Nature Reserve and Namadgi National Park and the NSW portion in Kosciuszko National Park. It is often climbed by bushwalkers from Corin Dam, as it is a few hours' hike. The mountain is close to the Ginini Flats Wetlands Ramsar Site.

Facilities
The mountain is home to an Airservices Australia installation serving as part of the AERIES network and as a transceiver for communications between ATCs and aircraft. It also hosts a repeater station for the local amateur radio club.

Climate
Mount Ginini has a subpolar oceanic climate (Cfc) with mild summers and cold winters.

See also

Mount Franklin
Mount Gingera
List of mountains of Australia
Skiing in the Australian Capital Territory
Skiing in Australia

References

Mountains of the Australian Capital Territory
Mountains of New South Wales
Borders of the Australian Capital Territory
Borders of New South Wales
Ski areas and resorts in the Australian Capital Territory
Brindabella Ranges